Ituzaingó is a barrio (neighbourhood or district) of Montevideo, Uruguay.

Location
It borders Castro Castellanos to the southwest, Las Acacias to the northwest, Jardines del Hipódromo to the northeast, Flor de Maroñas to the southeast and Villa Española to the south.

Places of worship 
 Parish Church of Our Lady of the Sacred Heart and St. Rita (Maroñas), which is also a Roman Catholic pilgrimage sanctuary

See also 
Barrios of Montevideo

References

External links 
 Revista Raices / Historia del barrio Maroñas/Pueblo Ituzaingò

Barrios of Montevideo